Southglenn Mall was a mid-size shopping center located on South University Boulevard in Centennial, Colorado, at the southwest corner of Arapahoe Road and University Boulevard. The center opened in 1974 and was closed from 2006 to August 2009 to make way for The Streets at SouthGlenn, a mixed-use redevelopment project.

History

 1974: $40 million Southglenn Mall opens with anchor stores Sears, The Denver (Denver Dry Goods) and May D&F. Developed by Denver-based Jordan Perlmutter & Co., the same company built Northglenn Mall and Southwest Plaza.
 1987: May Department Stores purchases Associated Dry Goods, operator of The Denver. May D&F remains at Southglenn while The Denver's building is sold to JCPenney.
 1988: The mall's first renovation takes place.  Asbestos abatement is undertaken at this time.
 1993: May D&F rebrands as Foley's, following the acquisition of Foley's from Federated in 1988 by parent May Department Stores.
 1994: Joslins Department Store constructs a $23 million,  flagship store on the east side of the mall.
 1996: Southglenn sales slump following the debut of Park Meadows, a Douglas County center with anchors Dillard's, Foley's, Nordstrom, and Joslins.
 1998: Joslins becomes Dillard's after Joslins parent Mercantile Stores is acquired by Dillard's.
 1999: Early January 1999, Southglenn Mall is sold to Chicago-based Walton Street Capital.
 1999: JCPenney converts to JCPenney Home Store following the opening of a new JCPenney store at Park Meadows mall.
 2001: Southglenn undergoes a minor interior renovation. The ceilings in the main corridors are redesigned, and new tiles, lights, and bannisters are installed in an attempt to stave off the exodus of some small and mid-size tenants to newer malls around the area.
 2002: JCPenney Home Store closes
 2005: Alberta Development Partners and the City of Centennial announce plan to redevelop the mall into Streets at Southglenn.
 2005: Following a large snowstorm, Southglenn's west parking lots served as a drop off for tree limbs.
 February 2006: Southglenn Mall and Dillard's close their doors in preparation for redevelopment. Sears and Macy's remained open. Though the Walgreens on the mall's exterior closed, pharmaceutical operations continue uninterrupted from a temporary building on the east side of the mall property until a new permanent structure can be erected. Demolition of the former mall structure will commence mid-June.
 June 15, 2006: groundbreaking for redevelopment at 11 AM local time.
 July 17, 2008: Best Buy opens
 August 28, 2009: Streets at Southglenn opens

Demolition and redevelopment

The majority of the former mall structure between Macy's and Sears was removed. The mall's concrete building pad was removed, crushed, and piled for reuse.  The redeveloped Streets at SouthGlenn sports a variety of entertainment and shopping, along with space for business and residential uses.

The new junior anchors as of 2012 are: Macy's Home Store, Staples, Dick's Sporting Goods, and Best Buy. Other anchors include Macy's, and a Hollywood Theaters (currently operated by Regal) location with 14 screens, and a Whole Foods Market. One of the largest spaces in the redevelopment was slated to be occupied by Barnes & Noble, but in 2012 an Old Navy store opened in this location.

On October 15, 2018, it was announced that Sears would be closing as part of a plan to close 142 stores nationwide.

On January 5, 2022, it was announced that Macy's would be closing as part of a plan to close 7 stores nationwide. It is the last store from the original mall.

References

External links
 Streets at Southglenn site
 Celebrate Southglenn: City of Centennial
 Updated journal of events on site
 Official developer site

Shopping malls established in 1974
Centennial, Colorado
Shopping malls in Colorado
Buildings and structures in Arapahoe County, Colorado